The APRA Music Awards of 2022 are the 40th annual series, known as the APRA Awards. The awards are given in a series of categories in three divisions and in separate ceremonies throughout the year: the APRA Music Awards, Art Music Awards and Screen Music Awards. The APRA Music Awards are provided by APRA AMCOS (Australasian Performing Right Association and Australasian Mechanical Copyright Owners Society) and celebrate excellence in contemporary music, honouring songwriters and publishers that have achieved artistic excellence and outstanding success in their fields.

On 3 February 2022, the 20-song longlist for the APRA Song of the Year was announced. The full list of nominees for the 2022 APRA Music Awards were revealed on 7 April. Winners were announced on 3 May 2022. The Art Music Awards are sponsored by APRA AMCOS and Australian Music Centre (AMC). They were presented on 31 August at the Meat Market, North Melbourne with the finalists announced on 26 July. Screen Music Awards are jointly presented by APRA AMCOS and Australian Guild of Screen Composers (AGSC) to "acknowledge excellence and innovation in the field of screen composition." The ceremony was held on 15 November 2022 at the Forum, Melbourne.

APRA Music Awards

Ted Albert Award for Outstanding Services to Australian Music

 The Wiggles

APRA Song of the Year

Breakthrough Songwriter of the Year

Most Performed Australian Work

Most Performed Australian Work Overseas

Most Performed Alternative Work

Most Performed Blues & Roots Work

Most Performed Country Work

Most Performed Dance/Electronic Work

Most Performed Hip Hop / Rap Work

Most Performed Pop Work

Most Performed R&B / Soul Work

Most Performed Rock Work

Most Performed International Work

Art Music Awards

Work of the Year: Chamber Music

Work of the Year: Choral

Work of the Year: Dramatic

Work of the Year: Electroacoustic/Sound Art

Work of the Year: Jazz

Work of the Year: Large Ensemble

Performance of the Year: Jazz / Improvised Music

Performance of the Year: Notated Composition

Award for Excellence in Music Education

Award for Excellence in Experimental Music

Richard Gill Award for Distinguished Services to Australian Music

Luminary Award: Individual (National)

Luminary Award: Organisation (National)

Luminary Award: State & Territory Awards

References

2022 in Australian music
2022 music awards
APRA Awards